Profundiconus frausseni is a species of sea snail, a marine gastropod mollusk in the family Conidae, the cone snails and their allies.

Like all species within the genus Profundiconus, these cone snails are predatory and venomous. They are capable of "stinging" humans, therefore live ones should be handled carefully or not at all.

Description
The size of the shell varies between 21.3 mm and 47 mm.

Distribution
This marine species occurs off the Philippines.

References

Description of three deep-water species of Conus from the central Philippines. (Gastropoda, Conidae).. Visaya 1: 20-30
 Tucker J.K. & Tenorio M.J. (2009) Systematic classification of Recent and fossil conoidean gastropods. Hackenheim: Conchbooks. 296 pp.

External links
 The Conus Biodiversity website
 

frausseni
Gastropods described in 2004